Adrian Błąd (born 16 April 1991 in Lubin) is a Polish professional footballer who plays as a winger for GKS Katowice.

Career

Club
He made his debut for Zagłębie in a 1-0 defeat to Ruch Chorzów on 21 August 2009.

In July 2011, he was loaned to Zawisza Bydgoszcz.

7 December 2012, he was back to Zagłębie Lubin.

Honours

Club
Arka Gdynia
 Polish Cup: 2016–17

References

External links 
 
 

Polish footballers
Poland youth international footballers
Zagłębie Lubin players
Zawisza Bydgoszcz players
Arka Gdynia players
GKS Katowice players
Ekstraklasa players
I liga players
II liga players
Living people
1991 births
People from Lubin
Sportspeople from Lower Silesian Voivodeship
Association football wingers